is a Japanese politician and the former mayor of Sagamihara a designated city in Kanagawa Prefecture, Japan. He was first elected in 2007. He was reelected in 2011 and 2015but lost his bid for a fourth term in 2019 to Kentaro Motomura.

References 

Mayors of places in Kanagawa Prefecture
1945 births
Living people